Willie Nelson & Friends – Stars & Guitars is a 2002 live album by country singer Willie Nelson.

Track listing

Personnel
House band (tracks 1-16, 18):
 Robert Bailey - backing vocals
 Kim Fleming - backing vocals
 Vicki Hampton - backing vocals
 Glenn Worf - bass
 Chad Cromwell - drums
 Richard Bennett - electric guitar, acoustic guitar
 Mickey Raphael - harmonica
 Jim Cox - keyboards
 Bill Evans - saxophone
 Dan Dugmore - steel guitar, acoustic guitar

Chart performance

References

2002 live albums
Willie Nelson live albums
Columbia Records live albums